Sarra Touibi (born 30 January 1959) is a retired Tunisian runner who saw success on continental level.

At the Arab Athletics Championships she won four gold medals; the 200 and 400 metres in 1979 and the 400 and 800 metres in 1983. She also won the 400 metres at the 1975 Maghreb Championships.

At the 1981 Arab Championships she won a silver medal in the 400 metres, likewise at the 1981 Maghreb Championships. She won two bronze medals at the 1983 Maghreb Championships, in the 400 and 800 metres. She also finished a distant fourth in the 400 metres at the 1979 Mediterranean Games and sixth in the 800 metres at the 1983 Mediterranean Games.

She became Tunisian double champion in the 400 and 800 metres in 1982, 1983 and 1986.

References

1959 births
Living people
Tunisian female sprinters
Tunisian female middle-distance runners
Athletes (track and field) at the 1979 Mediterranean Games
Athletes (track and field) at the 1983 Mediterranean Games
Mediterranean Games competitors for Tunisia
20th-century Tunisian women